Saiyed Khalid (born 21 October 1975) is an Indian former first-class cricketer. He is now an umpire and stood in matches in the 2015–16 Ranji Trophy.

References

External links
 

1975 births
Living people
Indian cricketers
Indian cricket umpires
Goa cricketers
People from Vadodara